Wang Dapeng (born 3 December 1996) is a Chinese recurve archer from Huangdao District in Qingdao. He represented China in the archery competition at the 2016 Summer Olympics in Rio de Janeiro.

References

External links
 

Chinese male archers
Living people
1996 births
Archers at the 2016 Summer Olympics
Olympic archers of China
Archers at the 2020 Summer Olympics
21st-century Chinese people